The Royal Parks Foundation is a registered charity established in 2003 (registered charity number 1097545). It is the charity that helps support London's eight London's Royal Parks for everyone to enjoy, now and in the future. The charity's patron is The Prince of Wales.

Deckchair Dreams

As part of its annual fund-raising efforts, the Foundation promotes Deckchair Dreams, through which artists donate individual works of art for the canvases of deck chairs which are reproduced and distributed through the Parks.

Among the artists and celebrities who have contributed to the scheme are Damien Hirst, Will Young, Antony Worrall Thompson, Tracey Emin, Alexander McQueen, and Raymond Briggs.

Deckchairs from the 2008 collection were recycled into sling bags, made by designer Bill Amberg.

2010
The 2010 collection of deckchairs draws on themes of nuts, fruits and seeds in the parks, and represents a partnership with the Shanghai Botanical Gardens, including designs by British and Chinese artists.

British designers include the milliner Philip Treacy, Rob Kesseler, cartoonists Ronald Searle and Alexander Williams, and the wildlife sculptor Simon Gudgeon. Treacy's design features an illustration of model Linda Evangelista wearing one of his hats.

Around 700 chairs have been made available across Kensington Gardens, Hyde Park, Green Park, St. James's Park and Regent's Park. Sara Lom of the Royal Parks Foundation said it had been "wonderful to partner with Shanghai" on the project.

Notes

References
Deckchair Dreams at Metro newspaper Retrieved August 1, 2010
Deckchair Dreams at BBC news Retrieved August 1, 2010
Alexander McQueen deckchair at the Daily Telegraph Retrieved July 31, 2010
Deckchair Dreams at Shanghai Expo 2010 Retrieved August 2, 2010

External links
Official website of the Royal Parks Foundation Retrieved August 1, 2010
Official website of Deckchair Dreams Retrieved August 1, 2010
Shanghai Botanic Gardens official site Retrieved July 31, 2010

Charities based in London
Organisations based in London with royal patronage